Leslie "Les" W. Holliday (born 8 August 1962) is an English former professional rugby league footballer who played in the 1980s and 1990s, and coached in the 1990s.

Background
Les Holliday was born in Whitehaven, Cumberland, England, he was a pupil at Cromwell Road School in Pendlebury.

Playing career

International honours
Les Holliday won caps for Great Britain while at Widnes in 1991 against France, and in 1992 against France (2 matches).

County honours
Les Holliday represented Cumbria.

Challenge Cup Final appearance
Les Holliday played left- for Halifax in the 12-32 defeat by Wigan in the 1988 Challenge Cup Final during the 1987–88 season at Wembley Stadium, London on Saturday 30 April 1988.

County Cup Final appearances
Les Holliday played  in Widnes' 24-18 victory over Salford in the 1990 Lancashire Cup Final during the 1990–91 season at Central Park, Wigan on Saturday 29 September 1990.

Regal Trophy Final appearances
Les Holliday played , and scored 4-goals in Halifax' 12-24 defeat by Wigan in the 1989–90 Regal Trophy Final during the 1989–90 season at Headingley, Leeds on Saturday 13 January 1990, and played , and scored a try, and a drop goal in Widnes' 24-0 victory over Leeds in the 1991–92 Regal Trophy Final during the 1991–92 season at Central Park, Wigan on Saturday 11 January 1992.

First Division Grand Final appearances
Les Holliday played  and was captain in Swinton's 27-10 victory over Hunslet in the 1986–87 Divisional Premiership Final at Old Trafford, Manchester on Sunday 17 May 1987.

Genealogical information
Les Holliday is the son of the rugby league footballer; Bill Holliday, and the brother of the rugby league footballer who played in the 1980s for Swinton and Leigh; Mike Holliday.

References

External links
!Great Britain Statistics at englandrl.co.uk (statistics currently missing due to not having appeared for both Great Britain, and England)
Statistics at rugby.widnes.tv

1962 births
Living people
Cumbria rugby league team players
Dewsbury Rams players
English rugby league coaches
English rugby league players
Great Britain national rugby league team players
Halifax R.L.F.C. players
Place of birth missing (living people)
Rugby league locks
Rugby league players from Whitehaven
Rugby league second-rows
Swinton Lions captains
Swinton Lions coaches
Swinton Lions players
Widnes Vikings players